Rave On!! is the third studio album released by the Southern American country rock band The Kentucky Headhunters. It was the first album recorded after the departure of brothers Ricky Lee Phelps and Doug Phelps, whose positions were replaced with lead vocalist Mark S. Orr and bass guitarist Anthony Kenney (who is the cousin of brothers Fred and Richard Young). The album produced three singles: "Honky Tonk Walkin'", "Blue Moon of Kentucky" and "Dixie Fried".

Three covers are included: "Dixie Fried" (originally by Carl Perkins), "My Gal" (originally by The Lovin' Spoonful) and "Blue Moon of Kentucky" (originally by Bill Monroe).

The album was reissued in December 2006 by CBUJ.

Track listing

Personnel
The Kentucky Headhunters
Greg Martin – electric guitar, slide guitar, background vocals
Anthony Kenney – bass guitar, background vocals
Mark S. Orr – lead vocals, background vocals
Fred Young – drums, percussion, background vocals
Richard Young – rhythm guitar, background vocals; piano on "Just Ask fo' Lucy"
Additional musicians
John Barlow Jarvis – piano on "Blue Moon of Kentucky"
David Wayne Jessie – tambourine on "Honky Tonk Walkin'"
John Lloyd Miller – tambourine on "Blue Moon of Kentucky"
Richard Ripani – piano on "Honky Tonk Walkin'", "Celina Tennessee" and "The Ghost of Hank Williams"

Chart performance

1993 albums
The Kentucky Headhunters albums
Mercury Nashville albums